San Giacomo di Rialto is a church in the sestiere of San Polo, Venice, northern Italy. The addition of Rialto to the name distinguishes this church from its namesake San Giacomo dell'Orio found in the sestiere of Santa Croce, on the same side of the Grand Canal.

It has a large 15th-century clock above the entrance, a useful item in the Venetian business district but regarded as a standing joke for its inaccuracy. The Gothic portico is one of the few surviving examples in Venice. It has a Latin cross plan with a central dome. Inside, the Veneto-Byzantine capitals on the six columns of ancient Greek marble date from the 11th century.

History

According to tradition, San Giacomo is the oldest church in the city, supposedly consecrated in the year 421. Although documents exist mentioning the area but not the church in 1097, the first document citing the church dates from 1152. It was rebuilt in 1071, prompting the establishment of the Rialto market with bankers and money changers in front of the church. The system with the "bill of exchange" was introduced here, as clients went with such a bill of exchange with a credit inscribed from one banker to another.

In 1503, it survived a fire which destroyed the rest of the area, and was restored from 1601 by order of Doge Marino Grimani . Works included raising of the pavement to counter the acqua alta.

Gallery

See also 
 : a nearby statue of a crouching man

References

Sources

Roman Catholic churches in Venice
16th-century Roman Catholic church buildings in Italy
Gothic architecture in Venice
Roman Catholic churches completed in 1601
1601 establishments in Italy